The canton of Ifs is an administrative division of the Calvados department, northwestern France. It was created at the French canton reorganisation which came into effect in March 2015. Its seat is in Ifs.

Composition 

It consists of the following communes:
Cormelles-le-Royal
Giberville
Ifs
Mondeville

Councillors

Pictures of the canton

References 

Cantons of Calvados (department)